The 1983 Guarujá Open was a tennis tournament held in Guarujá in Brazil and played on clay courts. It was part of the 1983 Volvo Grand Prix. The tournament took place from January 24 through January 31, 1983.

Finals

Singles
 José Luis Clerc defeated  Mats Wilander 3–6, 7–5, 6–1
 It was Clerc's 1st title of the year and the 23rd of his career.

Doubles
 Tim Gullikson /  Tomáš Šmíd defeated  Shlomo Glickstein /  Van Winitsky 6–4, 6–7, 6–4
 It was Gullikson's 1st title of the year and the 16th of his career. It was Šmíd's 1st title of the year and the 22nd of his career.

 
Guaruja Open
Guarujá Open